The Mandi, otherwise known as Manthi, were an Aboriginal Australian people of Western Australia.

Country
Its northern frontier was just below Boolathanna, and from Carnarvon extended westwards as far as Doorawarrah. It took in the lower Gascoyne River area and its swampy tributaries, with the southern boundary around Grey Point.

People
Norman Tindale defined the Mandi as a distinct tribe. Later work by the area language expert Peter Austin concluded that Tindale's distinction between the Mandi and the Tedei, both of which he regarded as independent tribes, should be reformulated, with the Mandi and Tedei actually representing two branches of the Yingkarta.

Alternative names
 Maandi
 Nandu

Notes

Citations

Sources

Aboriginal peoples of Western Australia
Gascoyne